Charles Rockwell (November 22, 1806 – April 17, 1882) was an American minister and author.

He graduated from Yale College in 1826. After leaving college, he was engaged in teaching for about five years,—for more than two of them in the Deaf and Dumb Asylum in Hartford, Conn. In 1834, he completed a three years' course of theological study at Andover Seminary, and for two and a half years after his ordination, at Hartford, Sept. 23, 1834, he performed service as Chaplain in the U. S. Navy, attached to vessels of the Mediterranean squadron. As a result of this cruise he published in 1842 two volumes of Sketches of Foreign Travel and Life at Sea.

After his return he was installed, March 27, 1839, pastor of the Congregational Church in Chatham, Mass., where he remained until 1845. The health of his family rendering a change of climate desirable, he removed in 1846 to Pontiac, Mich., and after preaching there for a year, went to Kentucky for two years of preaching and teaching. From April, 1850, to June, 1851, he supplied the pulpit of the Congregational Church in Sharon, Conn., and after a series of short engagements with various churches, became the pastor of a Dutch Reformed Church in Catskill, N. Y., in June, 1860. After closing this pastorate, in 1866, he published a volume on The Catskill Mountains and the Regions Around, which passed through several editions.

He continued for several years preaching and teaching in various places, and finally at the age of 74, in infirm health, became an inmate of the Home for Aged Men, in Albany, N Y., in October, 1880. He died there, of dropsy, April 17, 1882.

His first wife, Mary Howes, of Chatham, Mass., to whom he was married July 29, 1839, died in Henderson, Ky, in 1848.  He was married on June 10, 1852, to Mary Dayton, of East Hampton, L.I., who died before him. Of three children by his first marriage, one son survived him.

External links

1806 births
1882 deaths
People from Colebrook, Connecticut
Yale College alumni
Andover Newton Theological School alumni
United States Navy chaplains
American Congregationalist ministers
American male writers
American Calvinist and Reformed ministers
19th-century American clergy